The Twin Peaks are a pair of mountain high points located on the Cottonwood Ridge within the Wasatch Range in Salt Lake County, Utah. They are usually referred to as the Broads Fork Twin Peaks, to distinguish them from the nearby American Fork Twin Peaks and Avenues Twin Peaks. Consisting of two sub-peaks, only the eastern peak has the prominence to be considered a true summit. The summit rises directly from the Salt Lake Valley, making it easily visible and recognizable.

References 

Mountains of Utah
Mountains of Salt Lake County, Utah
Wasatch Range